The 2017 Cincinnati mayoral election took place on November 7, 2017, to elect the Mayor of Cincinnati, Ohio. The election was officially nonpartisan, with the top two candidates from the May 2 primary election advancing to the general election, regardless of party. Incumbent Democratic Mayor John Cranley won re-election to a second term.

While the election was nonpartisan, all the candidates were known Democrats.

Primary election

Candidates

Declared
 John Cranley (D), incumbent Mayor of Cincinnati
 Rob Richardson, Jr. (D), former University of Cincinnati board chairman
 Yvette Simpson (D), Cincinnati City Council member

Declined
 Greg Hartmann (R), former Hamilton County Commissioner
 Charlie Winburn (R), Cincinnati City Council member

Endorsements

Polling

Results

General election

Candidates
 John Cranley (D), incumbent Mayor of Cincinnati
 Yvette Simpson (D), Cincinnati City Council member, President Pro-Tempore

Endorsements

Polling

Results

References

External links
Official campaign websites
John Cranley for Mayor
Yvette Simpson for Mayor

Mayoral elections in Cincinnati
Cincinnati
Cincinnati
Cincinnati